Platanus mexicana is a species of plane tree that is native to Northeast and Central Mexico. It is also known as the Mexican sycamore.

Description
The tree can grow as high as 80 feet and has leaves that can be up to 8 inches wide.

References

mexicana